Giv'at Olga ("Olga's Hill") is a neighborhood of the Israeli city of Hadera. It was named after Olga Hankin, the wife of the Zionist activist Yehoshua Hankin. It was founded in 1949 around the house Hankin built known as Olga Hankin's House (Beit Olga Hankin or simply Beit Hankin).

Beit Olga Hankin
Olga's House is built on a kurkar cliff, which Hankin named Olga's Hill (after which the neighborhood was named). The cliff is part of the Sharon coastal ridge. The house was built in the Bauhaus style and oversees the Kfar Hayam beach of the  Binyamin Bay. For a long Olga's House was in the state of neglect and disrepair. Eventually in  2004 the house was renovated and a restaurant was opened in it operated by Eric Vashdi, a long-time manager of Beit Hankin. However in 2021 the site was shut down because the coastal cliff  upon which it stands is unstable. At the same time works have been started to stabilize this part the coastal area.

For another house of Hankins, see Ma'ayan Harod#House and tomb of Yehoshua Hankin

Science, sports, recreation
Giv'at Olga is the location of the Technoda, an educational center for science and technology, equipped with a state-of-the-art telescope and planetarium.

During 1953-2015 Giv'at Olga had a football club.

Olga Beach Nature Reserve is southeast of the neighborhood.

Notable residents
Yehoshua Hankin
Olga Hankin
Moshe Kahlon (born here in 1960), Israeli politician
Or Kahlon (born here in 1988), Israeli dancer
Tzuri Gueta
Isaac Bachman

See also
Sharon Escarpment

References

Hadera